Fish Island may refer to:


Islands

Canada
 Fish Island, West Isles Parish, New Brunswick
 Fish Island (Ottawa River), Ottawa River, Ontario
 Fish Island, Malpeque Bay, Prince Edward Island

United States
 Fish Island (Alaska), in the Gulf of Alaska
 Fish Island (Massachusetts)
 Fish Island (New Hampshire) - see List of islands of New Hampshire
 Fish Island (New York), in Irondequoit Bay
 Fish Island (Wisconsin)

Other uses
 Fish Island, London, an area of the city
 Fish Island Site, a historic site south of St. Augustine, Florida
 Fish Island, former name of Dexter, New York, a village
 Fish Island, a 2012 video game released by NHN Entertainment Corporation
 "Fish Island", a 2013 digital single by Tsuri Bit, a Japanese girl group

See also
 Fiskeøen (Fish Island), an artificial island in one of The Lakes, Copenhagen, Denmark
 Motu Ika (Fish Island), another name for Motukaraka Island, off Auckland, New Zealand
 Yúshān (Fish Island) - see List of places depicted in the Mao Kun map, an early 15th century map
 Fish Islands, a group of islands off the coast of West Antarctica